{{Speciesbox
| image = Sagartia003.jpg
| image_caption = Several species of Sagartia. S. troglodytes is at top right.
| taxon = Sagartia troglodytes
| authority = (Price in Johnston, 1847) 
| synonyms =  
 Actinea troglodytes
 Actinia aurora Gosse, 1854
 Actinia ornata Holdsworth, 1855
 Actinia troglodytes Price in Johnston, 1847
 Actinia viduata W. Thompson
 Cylista troglodytes (Price in Johnston, 1847)
 Heliactis ornata Holdsworth
 Heliactis troglodytes
 Heliactis venusta Gosse
 Sagaratia troglodytes
 Sagartia undata troglodytes Carlgren, 1893
 Scolanthus sphaeroides Holdsworth, 1855}}Sagartia troglodytes is a species of sea anemone in the family Sagartiidae, also known as the mud sagartia or the cave-dwelling anemone.

Description
The base is anchored in holes in the rock and is a little wider than the column. This is smooth and firm, extending to a length several times its width, and covered in sticky suckers on its upper part. The usually flat oral disc is finely patterned and surrounded by four or five rings of numerous short tentacles, the longest ones being nearest the mouth. This is raised on a slight mound at the centre of the disc. The general colour is varying sombre shade of olive green or brown with vertical striations on the column. The radial striations on the oral disc are finely patterned in grey, white and black and the tentacles are translucent and banded in white and grey. At the base of each tentacle there is a distinctive black mark shaped like a Roman capital letter "B". Pieces of gravel and fragments of shell are often stuck to the upper part of the column. In size, the column can grow to a diameter of an inch (2.5 cm) and a length of two inches (5 cm) but most specimens are much smaller than this.

Distribution and habitatS. troglodytes is found in coastal regions of the north east Atlantic Ocean, the North Sea and the Mediterranean Sea. It is common round the coasts of Britain between the tide marks but is relatively little observed because it is well camouflaged and is often hidden in cracks, under overhangs, in rock pools, under seaweed, among mussels or half buried in sand and mud with just its tentacles projecting. In Morecambe Bay, England, it is found anchored to stones buried several inches beneath the surface of this expanse of mudflats, or sometimes not even attached at all but living freely. It can retract into a spherical form when disturbed and no longer be visible from the surface.

Biology
Like other sea anemones, S. troglodytes is a carnivore and feeds on small invertebrates which it traps with its tentacles and channels into its mouth. Any undigested pieces are expelled from the mouth over the period of a few hours or days.S. troglodytes'' is a hermaphrodite with gonads inside the body cavity. The eggs are discharged from the mouth, being wafted out individually by cilia on the tentacles. The sperm are produced separately also emanating from the mouth when they give the appearance of a white plume being liberated into the water column. The fertilised egg develops into a planula larva which becomes part of the zooplankton and later settles and develops into a new individual. The species can also reproduce asexually by the liberation of "ciliated germs" through the walls of the lower column.

References

Sagartiidae
Cnidarians of the Atlantic Ocean
Fauna of the Mediterranean Sea
Animals described in 1847